Melchisedec is a genus of African goblin spiders first described by W. Fannes in 2010.  it contains only two species.

References

Araneomorphae genera
Oonopidae